Ichwan Tuharea (born 14 November 2000) is an Indonesian professional footballer who plays as a midfielder for Liga 1 club Bhayangkara.

Club career

Bhayangkara
He was signed for Bhayangkara to play in Liga 1 in the 2019 season. Ichwan made his professional debut on 20 February 2022 in a match against Persikabo 1973 at the Kompyang Sujana Stadium, Denpasar.

Career statistics

Club

Notes

References

External links
 Ichwan Tuharea at Soccerway
 Ichwan Tuharea at Liga Indonesia

2000 births
Living people
Indonesian footballers
Liga 1 (Indonesia) players
Liga 2 (Indonesia) players
Bhayangkara F.C. players
PSMS Medan players
Association football midfielders
People from Maluku Islands